West Scranton High School, is a community-based school in the "West Side" neighborhood of Scranton, Pennsylvania, United States. It is one of the oldest schools in the area, having opened to the public in 1935, first as a junior high facility and later as a high school. It offers about 32 clubs and 17 sports, and hosts grades 9 through 12. Robert DeLuca is the school's current principal. The school colors are royal blue and white and the mascot is the Invader. It is a public school enrolling approximately 1,000 students, with an average of about 250 students in each grade.

Extracurriculars
Scranton School District offers a variety of clubs, activities and sports.

Sports

Baseball
Basketball (boys' and girls')
Cheerleading (football and basketball)
Cross country
Football- Coached by Jake Manetti
Golf
Soccer (boys' and girls')
Softball
Swimming and diving
Tennis (boys' and girls')
Track and field
Wrestling

The school's biggest athletic rival is the Scranton High School Knights, who share a football stadium - Memorial Stadium, located outside Scranton High School - with the Invaders. Each year, the two teams meet in "The Bell Game," usually in early October. The winner of the football game takes a locomotive bell, to remain in the victor's school until the following meeting.

Notable alumni

Nick Chickillo - NFL player
Bill Ferrario - former NFL player with Green Bay Packers and Carolina Panthers
Cosmo Iacavazzi - college football Hall of Famer
Don Jonas - former Penn State running back
Kathleen Kane - Pennsylvania Attorney General convicted of felony perjury
Matt McGloin - Penn State football, Oakland Raiders, Philadelphia Eagles (NFL),New York Guardians (XFL)
Marc Spindler - former Pitt Panther and NFL football player
Tyra Vaughn - showgirl, actress, dancer, dance teacher

References

Scranton, Pennsylvania
Schools in Lackawanna County, Pennsylvania
Public high schools in Pennsylvania
Educational institutions established in 1935
1935 establishments in Pennsylvania